In particle physics, a massless particle is an elementary particle whose invariant mass is zero. There are two known gauge boson massless particles: the photon (carrier of electromagnetism) and the gluon (carrier of the strong force). However, gluons are never observed as free particles, since they are confined within hadrons. In addition the Weyl semimetal or Weyl fermion discovered in 2015 is also massless. 

Neutrinos were originally thought to be massless. However, because neutrinos change flavor as they travel, at least two of the types of neutrinos must have mass. The discovery of this phenomenon, known as neutrino oscillation, led to Canadian scientist Arthur B. McDonald and Japanese scientist Takaaki Kajita sharing the 2015 Nobel prize in physics.

Note that although literal Weyl fermions have never been experimentally confirmed to physically exist, certain systems can act collectively such that they seem to contain Weyl fermion quasiparticles.

See also
Relativistic particle
Gravitational waves

References

Special relativity
Particle physics